Reisbach is a small town, belonging to the district of Saarlouis in the Bundesland Saarland.

The village was formed on April 1, 1937, when the two townships of Reisweiler and Labach were joint together as "Reisbach".

Reisweiler was first mentioned as "Radisville" in 1154. The Germanic name "Radi" means "father of the town council", which, together with the "-ville" suffix meaning "farmland", yields the meaning of "Reisweiler" as "Radi's Farmland".

The first written documentation about Labach stems from the 13th century, when it was known under the name "Loupach" or "Loupbach". The name is composed from "Loup" meaning "foliage" (German "Laub") and "Bach" meaning "creek".

The name of the consolidated village thus means "Radi's Creek".

Since January 1, 1974, Reisbach has formed the municipality of Saarwellingen, together with Saarwellingen proper and Schwarzenholz with a combined 14,000 inhabitants.

History
In 1212, Count Heinrich of Zweibrücken gave his ownership of the villages Reisweiler and Labach to Fraulautern Abbey.

The knights Marsilius and Reiner and their relative Marsilius von Lisdorf donated their stake in the patronage to the church of Reisweiler in 1237.

Labach belonged to the lordship of Schwarzenholz, and thus Fraulautern Abbey, until 1792, when the French Revolution changed everything. It also ended the ownership of the Grafschaft Saarbrücken and the Lord of Hagen over Reisweiler.

Coat of arms
The coat of arms resembles the rulerships over the two villages: The base is the coat of arms of the Lords of Saarbrücken (Lisdorf), the diagonal bar, while the red and gold colors stem from the coat of arms of the Lords of Zweibrücken. The two fields formed by the diagonal bar stand for the two villages which form Reisbach: the upper field for Labach, with the crossed circle of Fraulautern Abbey; the lower field for Reisweiler, with the cross of the Lords of Bolchen.

Reisbach was given the right to bear a coat of arms on May 11, 1964.

Former municipalities in Saarland